The Arda is a  river in Bulgaria and Greece. It is a tributary of the Maritsa (or Evros). Its source lies in the Bulgarian Rhodope Mountains near the village Arda, part of the municipality of Smolyan. It flows eastward past Rudozem, Kardzhali and Ivaylovgrad and enters Greece in the northern part of the Evros regional unit. It flows into the Maritsa on the border of Greece and Turkey, between the Greek village Kastanies and the Turkish city Edirne. In the Bulgarian section there are three hydroelectric and irrigation dams, Kardzhali Dam, Studen Kladenets and Ivaylovgrad Dam. The medieval Dyavolski most arch bridge crosses the river  from Ardino.

The merging of the waters of the Maritsa (Evros/Meriç) caused streets and buildings including homes to be flooded and people to be stranded in their homes.

Arda Peak on Livingston Island in the South Shetland Islands, Antarctica and the mineral ardaite are named after the Arda river.

Archeology and places of interest

The Arda valley and the valleys of its tributaries have been a preferred place for habitation since ancient times. A settlement from 6,000 BC was discovered during the construction works in the area of ​​the town of Kardzhali. Many archeological sites were discovered in the region, including the famous Thracian cult complexes Perperek, known as Perperikon for the last 20 years, as well as the sacred site of Tatul. To cross the ancient roads to the Aegean, several stone bridges were built on the river, impressive in size and architecture. One fully preserved bridge is the Devil's Bridge in the area of ​​the village of Dyadovtsi (Ardino municipality). There are remnants of bridges in several places in the region: near the villages of Suhovo and Borovitsa, and another three have remained under the waters of the dams.

Gallery

References

Rivers of Bulgaria
Rivers of Greece
Rivers of Turkey
Rhodope Mountains
International rivers of Europe
Landforms of Edirne Province
Landforms of Smolyan Province
Landforms of Kardzhali Province
Landforms of Haskovo Province
Landforms of Evros (regional unit)
Rivers of Eastern Macedonia and Thrace